The Muallim District is the eleventh district of the state of Perak, Malaysia, situated at the southeastern tip of the state, bordering the state of Selangor. It was proclaimed by the current Sultan of Perak, Sultan Nazrin Muizzuddin Shah on 11 January 2016 at the Tanjung Malim District Council Building. The district was previously part of the neighbouring Batang Padang district.

It covers an area of 93,435-hectares of land.

The district includes the towns of Slim River, Tanjung Malim and Proton City. It was given the name Muallim, the Arabic word for "teacher", because of the Sultan Idris Education University in the district. The university has produced many teachers since the colonial era.

Administrative divisions

The Muallim District is divided into two mukims (townships), which are:
 Ulu Bernam (East and West)
 Slim

The east and west parts of the Ulu Bernam mukim is separated by the town of Hulu Bernam, which is a part of Hulu Selangor, Selangor. West Ulu Bernam is an exclave of the district and the mukim.

Demographics

Federal Parliament and State Assembly Seats 
The parliamentary constituency of Tanjong Malim encompasses the entire district. It also supplies two state constituencies in the Perak State Legislative Assembly.

List of Muallim district representatives in the Federal Parliament (Dewan Rakyat)

List of Muallim district representatives in the State Legislative Assembly of Perak

See also

 Districts of Malaysia

References